Robert Joshua Rubin (August 17, 1926 – January 18, 2008) was an American mathematician whose work involved modelling complex physical systems. He worked principally at the National Bureau of Standards, and was a Fellow of the American Association for the Advancement of Science and also a Fellow of the American Physical Society.

Education and career 
He received his bachelor's degree from Cornell University, and his doctorate also from Cornell, in 1951; his doctoral advisor was Peter Debye.

He worked first at the Johns Hopkins Advanced Physics Laboratory, and then at the Bureau of Standards.

Personal life 
From 1948 until his death in 2008, he was married to Vera Rubin. His children include Judith Young (astronomer) and Karl Rubin (mathematician).

References 

1926 births
2008 deaths
Cornell University alumni
Fellows of the American Association for the Advancement of Science
Fellows of the American Physical Society
Scientists from New York City
National Institute of Standards and Technology people